Giacomo "Mino" Bozzano (born 12 April 1933 in Sestri Levante - died 21 November 2008) was a former Italian boxer, who won the bronze medal in the Heavyweight division (+ 91 kg) at the 1956 Summer Olympics in Melbourne, Australia.  He lost to Lev Mukhin of the Soviet Union and was eliminated, but then, at just age 23 he went into pro boxing post-Olympics.

1956 Olympic results
Below is the record of Giacomo Bozzano, an Italian heavyweight boxer who competed at the 1956 Melbourne Olympics:

 Round of 16: defeated Ilkka Koski (Finland) by decision
 Quarterfinal: defeated Ulrich Nitzschke (Germany) by decision
 Semifinal: lost to Lev Mukhin (Soviet Union) by third-round knockout (was awarded bronze medal)

Pro career
Bozzano turned pro in 1957 and won his first 25 fights, including a win over Joey Maxim, before being KO'd by Hans Kalbfell in 1960.  The following year he was upset by Gerhard Zech.   Zech, who had only eight paid bouts to his credit and no amateur experience, figured to be another pushover. But Bozzano was obviously ring-rusty and in the second round the Berlin southpaw slammed a hefty right-hander to the Italian's ribs. He threw a left hook at Bozzano's chin and the Italian crumpled to the canvas, out cold.

In 1962, Bozzano took on Santo Amonti for the Italian heavyweight title.   Bozzano played into Amonti's hands by carrying out repeated attacks at close quarters instead of relying on his superior reach and boxing skill. No knockdowns were scored but Bozzano soaked up a welter of punches by the third round that he was obliged to raise his arms in defeat, completely groggy.  
Bozzano retired after the bout.

He died in Sestri Levante in November 2008.

Professional boxing record

|-
|align="center" colspan=8|31 Wins (15 knockouts, 15 decisions, 1 DQ), 3 Losses (3 knockouts) 
|-
| align="center" style="border-style: none none solid solid; background: #e3e3e3"|Result
| align="center" style="border-style: none none solid solid; background: #e3e3e3"|Record
| align="center" style="border-style: none none solid solid; background: #e3e3e3"|Opponent
| align="center" style="border-style: none none solid solid; background: #e3e3e3"|Type
| align="center" style="border-style: none none solid solid; background: #e3e3e3"|Round
| align="center" style="border-style: none none solid solid; background: #e3e3e3"|Date
| align="center" style="border-style: none none solid solid; background: #e3e3e3"|Location
| align="center" style="border-style: none none solid solid; background: #e3e3e3"|Notes
|-align=center
|Loss
|
|align=left| Santo Amonti
|TKO
|3
|13/10/1962
|align=left| Rome, Lazio
|align=left|
|-
|Win
|
|align=left| Horst Niche
|PTS
|10
|26/05/1962
|align=left| Genoa, Liguria
|align=left|
|-
|Win
|
|align=left| Horst Niche
|PTS
|8
|20/12/1961
|align=left| Bologna, Emilia-Romagna
|align=left|
|-
|Win
|
|align=left| Jose Peyre
|TKO
|7
|22/11/1961
|align=left| Genoa, Liguria
|align=left|
|-
|Win
|
|align=left| Alain Cherville
|TKO
|8
|30/09/1961
|align=left| Teatro Margherita, Genoa, Liguria
|align=left|
|-
|Win
|
|align=left| José González Sales
|KO
|3
|12/08/1961
|align=left| Genoa, Liguria
|align=left|
|-
|Loss
|
|align=left| Gerhard Zech
|KO
|2
|07/12/1960
|align=left| Palasport di San Siro, Milan, Lombardy
|align=left|
|-
|Win
|
|align=left| Bert Whitehurst
|PTS
|10
|01/09/1960
|align=left| Palasport di San Siro, Milan, Lombardy
|align=left|
|-
|Loss
|
|align=left| Hans Kalbfell
|KO
|8
|05/11/1959
|align=left| Westfalenhallen, Dortmund, North Rhine-Westphalia
|align=left|
|-
|Win
|
|align=left| Rocky Brown
|KO
|1
|27/05/1959
|align=left| Milan, Lombardy
|align=left|
|-
|Win
|
|align=left| Joe Bygraves
|PTS
|10
|19/04/1959
|align=left| Velodromo Vigorelli, Milan, Lombardy
|align=left|
|-
|Win
|
|align=left| Robert Duquesne
|DQ
|3
|31/01/1959
|align=left| Palasport di San Siro, Milan, Lombardy
|align=left|
|-
|Win
|
|align=left| Sifa Kivalu
|TKO
|6
|29/11/1958
|align=left| Milan, Lombardy
|align=left|
|-
|Win
|
|align=left| Al Kramp
|TKO
|1
|18/10/1958
|align=left| Palasport di San Siro, Milan, Lombardy
|align=left|
|-
|Win
|
|align=left| Franco Cavicchi
|KO
|8
|07/09/1958
|align=left| Bologna, Emilia-Romagna
|align=left|
|-
|Win
|
|align=left| Emile Vidal
|TKO
|5
|18/07/1958
|align=left| Foro Italico, Rome, Lazio
|align=left|
|-
|Win
|
|align=left| José González Sales
|TKO
|4
|15/06/1958
|align=left| Bologna Sports Palace, Bologna, Emilia-Romagna
|align=left|
|-
|Win
|
|align=left| Joey Maxim
|PTS
|10
|27/04/1958
|align=left| Milan, Lombardy
|align=left|
|-
|Win
|
|align=left| Ossi Buettner
|PTS
|8
|08/02/1958
|align=left| Sporthalle, Basel
|align=left|
|-
|Win
|
|align=left| Hans Friedrich
|PTS
|10
|26/12/1957
|align=left| Palasport di San Siro, Milan, Lombardy
|align=left|
|-
|Win
|
|align=left| Maurice Mols
|PTS
|8
|26/10/1957
|align=left| Milan, Lombardy
|align=left|
|-
|Win
|
|align=left| Uber Bacilieri
|PTS
|8
|16/10/1957
|align=left| Milan, Lombardy
|align=left|
|-
|Win
|
|align=left| Alain Cherville
|PTS
|8
|14/09/1957
|align=left| Milan, Lombardy
|align=left|
|-
|Win
|
|align=left| Maurice Mols
|PTS
|8
|27/07/1957
|align=left| Stadio Marassi, Genoa, Liguria
|align=left|
|-
|Win
|
|align=left| Eriwn Hack
|TKO
|6
|26/06/1957
|align=left| Milan, Lombardy
|align=left|
|-
|Win
|
|align=left| Lucien Touzard
|KO
|4
|29/05/1957
|align=left| Velodromo Vigorelli, Milan, Lombardy
|align=left|
|-
|Win
|
|align=left| Louis De Bolster
|PTS
|6
|15/05/1957
|align=left| Genoa, Liguria
|align=left|
|-
|Win
|
|align=left| Bonino Allevi
|TKO
|4
|08/05/1957
|align=left| Chiavari, Liguria
|align=left|
|-
|Win
|
|align=left| Marcel Limage
|TKO
|5
|27/04/1957
|align=left| Milan, Lombardy
|align=left|
|-
|Win
|
|align=left| Armand Boudin
|TKO
|3
|16/04/1957
|align=left| Pavia, Lombardy
|align=left|
|-
|Win
|
|align=left| Hans Peter Drabes
|PTS
|6
|03/04/1957
|align=left| Milan, Lombardy
|align=left|
|-
|Win
|
|align=left| Heinz Lemm
|PTS
|6
|20/03/1957
|align=left| Milan, Lombardy
|align=left|
|-
|Win
|
|align=left| Horst Herold
|PTS
|6
|13/03/1957
|align=left| Milan, Lombardy
|align=left|
|-
|Win
|
|align=left| Dante Lepercq
|TKO
|5
|02/03/1957
|align=left| Palasport di San Siro, Milan, Lombardy
|align=left|
|}

References
 

1933 births
2008 deaths
Olympic boxers of Italy
Boxers at the 1956 Summer Olympics
Olympic medalists in boxing
Italian male boxers
Medalists at the 1956 Summer Olympics
Olympic bronze medalists for Italy
Heavyweight boxers